The 2004 Asian Junior Badminton Championships is an Asia continental junior championships to crown the best U-19 badminton players across Asia. This tournament were held in Hwacheon Indoor Stadium, Hwacheon, South Korea from 12–18 July.

Medalists

Medal table

References

External links 
 2004 Asian Junior Badminton Championships at koreabadminton.org
 Medallists at koreabadminton.org
 Team event entries at koreabadminton.org

Badminton Asia Junior Championships
Asian Junior Badminton Championships
Asian Junior Badminton Championships
International sports competitions hosted by South Korea
2004 in youth sport